James Kisai, SJ, also known as  or Jacobo Kisai, was a Japanese Jesuit lay brother and saint, one of the 26 Martyrs of Japan.

Out of the 26, Kisai, Paul Miki, and John Soan de Goto were the only Jesuits to be executed in Nagasaki on February 5, 1597.

Biography
James Kisai was born as Ichikawa Kisaemon (市川喜佐衛門).

As a lay catechist intending to join the Society of Jesus, he was imprisoned along with 23 other Catholics in December 1596 in the aftermath of the pivotal San Felipe incident. While he was in prison, Kisai and a fellow lay catechist John Soan de Goto gave their vows to Jesuit fathers John Rodriguez and Francis Pasia to enter the Jesuit order. Shortly after, Kisai and the other imprisoned Catholics were forced to take a land journey during the winter time from Sakai to Nagasaki. Kisai and the others would eventually reach Nishizaka Hill in Nagasaki, where they were crucified and lanced to death on February 5, 1597.

References

External links
Profile, catholic.org

Jesuit saints
Canonizations by Pope Pius IX
1530s births
1597 deaths
16th-century Christian saints
Beatifications by Pope Urban VIII
Date of birth unknown
Japanese Jesuits
Japanese Roman Catholics
Japanese Roman Catholic saints
Jesuit martyrs
26 Martyrs of Japan